Passenger is an upcoming British dark comedy-thriller television series created by Andrew Buchan in his screenwriting debut. It will premiere on ITVX in the United Kingdom before airing on ITV at a later date. It will have an international release on BritBox.

Cast

Production
In March 2022, it was announced ITV and BritBox International had commissioned a six-part series titled Passengers from actor Andrew Buchan in his screenwriting debut. Jane Featherstone and Lucy Dyke would executive produce the series for Sister Pictures with Simon Mahoney. Sumrah Mohammed served as producer, while Lee Haven-Jones and Nicole Charles directed the series.

It was announced in February 2023 that Wunmi Mosaku would lead the series alongside David Threlfall. Also joining the cast were Daniel Ryan, Rowan Robinson, Barry Sloane as Eddie Wells, Natalie Gavin, Nico Mirallegro, Hubert Hanowicz, and Jack James Ryan as well as Matilda Freeman, Shervin Alenabi, and Arian Nik.

Principal photography was underway in the West Yorkshire village of Cornholme as of February 2023.

References

External links
 

2023 British television series debuts
2020s British comedy-drama television series
British thriller television series
Upcoming television series
BritBox original programming
ITV (TV network) original programming
English-language television shows